Haliophyle is a genus of moths of the family Noctuidae.

Species
Haliophyle anthracias (Meyrick, 1899)
Haliophyle compsias (Meyrick, 1899)
Haliophyle connexa (Warren, 1912)
Haliophyle euclidias (Meyrick, 1899)
Haliophyle ferruginea (Swezey, 1932)
Haliophyle flavistigma (Warren, 1912)
Haliophyle ignita (Warren, 1912)
Haliophyle niphadopa (Meyrick, 1899)

References
Natural History Museum Lepidoptera genus database

Hadeninae